Roy Pollard (27 August 1927 – 30 October 2012) was an English professional rugby league footballer who played in the 1940s and 1950s.

Background
Roy Pollard's birth was registered in Wakefield district, West Riding of Yorkshire, England, and he died aged 85 in Wakefield, West Yorkshire, England.

International honours
Roy Pollard won caps for England while at Dewsbury in 1949 against France, and in 1950 against Wales, and won a cap for Great Britain while at Dewsbury in 1950 against New Zealand.

Genealogical information
Roy Pollard was the son of the rugby league footballer; Charles Pollard; the nephew of the rugby league footballer; Ernest Pollard; and the cousin of the Wakefield RFC player of 1956 to 1958, Anthony Pollard. Roy's brother, David, crossed codes to play rugby union. A member of the first post-war sports tour to Japan with Oxford University in 1951, he scored the only try of the 1952 varsity match, and went on to captain North Wales, where he still lives today.

References

External links

1927 births
2012 deaths
Dewsbury Rams players
Doncaster R.L.F.C. players
England national rugby league team players
English rugby league players
Great Britain national rugby league team players
Rugby league players from Wakefield
Rugby league wingers
Wakefield Trinity players